De Marchi or DeMarchi is a surname. Notable people with the surname include:

Adevildo De Marchi (1894–1965), Italian forward footballer
Alberto De Marchi (born 1986), Italian rugby union player
Alessandro De Marchi (conductor), Italian conductor
Alessandro De Marchi (cyclist) (born 1986), Italian cyclist
Andrea De Marchi (disambiguation) multiple people
Carlo De Marchi (1890–1972), Italian footballer in the role of midfielder
Denny DeMarchi, Canadian musician
Emilio De Marchi (actor) (born 1959), Italian film and television actor
Emilio De Marchi (tenor) (1861–1917), Italian opera singer
Juan De Marchi (1866–?), Italian anarchist
Laura De Marchi (born 1936), Italian actress
Marco De Marchi (born 1966), Italian footballer and agent
Matt DeMarchi (born 1981), American-born Italian ice hockey player
Mattia De Marchi (born 1991), Italian cyclist riding 
Michael De Marchi (born 1994), Italian footballer 
Neil De Marchi, Australian economist
Roberto De Marchi (1896–??), Italian wrestler
Secondo De Marchi (born 1911), Italian boxer
Steve DeMarchi, Canadian musician
Suze DeMarchi (born 1964), Australian singer-songwriter
Roberto DeMarchi (1927-2005), Argentinian painter and sculptor.

See also
De Marchi (clothing), Italian clothing company
Marchi, similar surname

Italian-language surnames